Illani (Aymara, also spelled Illane) is a  mountain in the Andes of Peru, about  high. It is located in the Puno Region, Lampa Province, Paratía District. Illani is situated southeast of the mountain Yanawara, east of the lake Sayt'uqucha and northwest of a group of lakes named Kimsaqucha (Quechua for "three lakes", Quimsaccocha).

References

Mountains of Puno Region
Mountains of Peru